Susan Richardson is a retired American actress, best known for her role as Susan Bradford on the television series Eight Is Enough, which she played from 1977 to 1981.

Early life
 
Born in Coatesville, Pennsylvania, Richardson first started acting in plays in high school. She graduated from Coatesville Area Senior High School in Coatesville, Pennsylvania in 1969, and moved to Hollywood in 1971.

Career
Initially, Richardson played bit roles in feature films American Graffiti (1973) and A Star Is Born (1976), and she guest-starred on the television series Happy Days and The Streets of San Francisco. Shortly before her 25th birthday, about six years after moving to the West Coast, Richardson was picked to play the fourth-oldest child in the Bradford family on Eight is Enough.

In her Eight Is Enough heyday, Richardson appeared in two installments of Battle of the Network Stars (May 1979 and December 1980), as well as numerous appearances on The $20,000 Pyramid, Password Plus, and Match Game, in addition to a one-hour All-Star episode of Family Feud in 1978 and a three-episode celebrity tournament on the daytime version in May 1979.

Personal life

On March 15, 1978, Richardson married Michael Virden, and shortly thereafter became pregnant, which was also written into Eight Is Enough. She gave birth to their daughter, Sarah, on February 27, 1980. After her pregnancy, a rumor was spread that Richardson would lose her job if she did not shed her pregnancy weight; she had gained . Finding it very difficult to slim down by normal means, she started using cocaine. 

In December 1987, Richardson claimed that she was held captive in South Korea. 

In January 2013, The Huffington Post published a report from a National Enquirer interview with Richardson. She reported she had experienced extremely hard times, living in an unheated trailer with a rotting floor in Wagontown, Pennsylvania, not far from her hometown of Coatesville. Richardson said she had developed diabetes, suffered three mini-strokes, had lost , and lost her teeth as the result of a digestive condition.

Filmography

References

External links
 
 

Living people
American television actresses
Actresses from Philadelphia
20th-century American actresses
American film actresses
People from Coatesville, Pennsylvania
21st-century American women
Year of birth missing (living people)